The 2021 Chatham Cup is New Zealand's 93rd annual knockout football competition.

The competition returns for 2021 after being cancelled in 2020 due to Covid-19. It will have a preliminary round and four rounds proper before quarter-finals, semi-finals, and a final.

Results

Preliminary round
Matches were played over the Anzac weekend of 23–26 April. This round contained three teams from the Auckland Sunday football leagues, University of Auckland FC, HNK Auckland, and AFC Bohemian Celtic, the lowest ranked teams left in the competition. A full list of results are as follows:

Northern Region

Central Region

Mainland Region

Southern Region

All teams listed below received byes to the first round.
Northern Region: Albany United FC, Auckland City FC, Auckland United FC, Bay Olympic FC, Beachlands Maraetai AFC, Birkenhead United AFC, Bucklands Beach AFC, Cambridge FC, Claudelands Rovers SC, East Coast Bays AFC, Eastern Suburbs AFC, Ellerslie AFC, Fencibles United AFC, Franklin United FC, Greenhithe FC, Hamilton Wanderers, Hibiscus Coast AFC, Manukau United FC, Manurewa AFC, Melville Utd AFC, Metro FC, Mt Albert-Ponsonby AFC, Ngaruawahia Utd AFC, North Shore United AFC, Northern Rovers FC, Onehunga Mangere United AFC, Oratia United FC, Papakura City FC, Papatoetoe AFC, Royal New Zealand Navy AFC, Takapuna AFC, Tauranga City AFC, Uni-Mount Bohemian AFC, Waiheke Utd AFC, Waitemata FC, West Coast Rangers FC, Western Springs AFC
Central Region: N/a

Capital Region: Brooklyn Northern Utd AFC, Island Bay United AFC, Kapiti Coast Utd, Lower Hutt City AFC, Miramar Rangers AFC, Napier City Rovers AFC, North Wellington FC, Palmerston North Marist Football Club, Petone FC, Seatoun AFC, Stokes Valley Football Club, Stop Out SC, Tawa AFC, Upper Hutt City Football, Victoria University, Waikanae AFC, Wainuiomata, Wairarapa United, Waterside Karori, Wellington Olympic AFC, Wellington United, Western Suburbs FC
Mainland Region: Burwood AFC, Cashmere Technical, Christchurch Utd, Coastal Spirit, Ferrymead Bays FC, Halswell United AFC, Nelson Suburbs FC, Nomads United AFC, Selwyn United FC, Waimakariri Utd
Southern Region: Grants Braes AFC, Green Island AFC, Mosgiel AFC, Northern AFC, Otago University AFC, Queens Park AFC, Queenstown AFC, Roslyn Wakari AFC, South City Royals FC, Thistle AFC - Timaru, Wanaka AFC

Round 1
Round 1 matches were played between 15–16 May 2021. This round contained one team from level 10, Otahuhu United, the lowest ranked team left in the competition. A full list of results are as follows:

Northern Region

Central / Capital Region

Mainland Region

Southern Region

All teams listed below received byes to the second round.
Northern Region: Auckland United FC, North Shore United AFC, Auckland City FC, Bay Olympic, Eastern Suburbs, Manukau United, Western Springs, Birkenhead United, Northern Rovers, West Coast Rangers, Hamilton Wanderers, Melville United, Albany United, Waitemata, Metro, Mt Albert Ponsonby
Capital Region: Wainuiomata, Wairarapa United, Western Suburbs, Wellington Olympic, Lower Hutt City, Miramar Rangers
Mainland: Nelson Suburbs
Southern: Otago University, Northern

Round 2
All matches were played on Queen's Birthday weekend 5-7 June 2021. This round contained one team from level 8, Whangarei, the lowest ranked team left in the competition. A full list of results are as follows: 

Northern Region

Capital / Central Region

Mainland Region

Southern Region

Round 3
All matches were played on the weekend of 18–20 June 2021.  This round contained three teams from level 5, Papakura City, West Hamilton United, and Ngaruawahia United, the lowest ranked teams left in the competition. A full list of results are as follows:

Northern Region

Central / Capital Region

Mainland

Southern Region

Round 4
All matches were played on the weekend of 10–11 July 2021. This round contained one team from level 5, Ngaruawahia United, the lowest ranked team left in the competition.

Northern Region

Capital / Central Region

Mainland / Southern Region

Quarter-finals
The quarter-finals were played on the weekend of 31 July–1 August 2021.

This round featured eight teams from the National League regional leagues (level 2), including four competing in the Championship phase (level 1).

Semi-finals
The semi-finals were meant to be played on the weekend of 21–22 August 2021 however due to a COVID-19 outbreak and the country going into lockdown, the games were postponed.

This round featured four teams from the National League regional leagues (level 2) including three competing in the Championship phase (level 1).

Final
The final was originally meant to be played on the 8 September 2021. It instead was delayed until the 6 March 2022.

Notes
The tier that teams are in (as indicated in brackets next to their name) are based on the New Zealand football league system for the 2021 season. As some teams can qualify and play in more than one league (and tier) per season, the highest tier that they take part in is the one noted next to their name.

References

External links
Chatham Cup section on the New Zealand Football website
Full replay of the final from Youtube.com

Chatham Cup
Chatham Cup
Chatham Cup
New Zealand, Chatham Cup
New Zealand, Chatham Cup